Ferhat Pehlivan (born August 20, 1988, in Akçaabat, Trabzon Province, Turkey) is a Turkish  amateur boxer competing in the light-flyweight division. He is coached by Altar Kalkışım. He is a student at the Atatürk University in Erzurum.

He won the bronze medal at the 2008 European Amateur Championships held in Liverpool, United Kingdom.

Pehlivan qualified for participation at the 2012 Summer Olympics.
At the 2012 Summer Olympics (results) he won two fights before being defeated by David Ayrapetyan. At the 2013 Mediterranean Games held in Mersin, Turkey, he won the silver medal.

Achievements
2007
 National Championships in Bursa, Turkey - 

2008
 37th European Amateur Championships in Liverpool, United Kingdom - 
 3rd World University Boxing Championship on September 21–28, 2008 in Kazan, Russia - 

2009
 16th Mediterranean Games in Pescara, Italy - 

2010
 4th World University Boxing Championship on October 4–10, 2010 in Ulan Bator, Mongolia - 

2011
 Silk Road Tournament on March 9–13, 2011 in Baku, Azerbaijan - 
 Felix Stam Tournament in Warsaw, Poland -

References

Light-flyweight boxers
Atatürk University alumni
People from Akçaabat
Living people
1988 births
Fenerbahçe boxers
Boxers at the 2012 Summer Olympics
Olympic boxers of Turkey
Turkish male boxers
Boxers at the 2015 European Games
European Games competitors for Turkey
Mediterranean Games silver medalists for Turkey
Mediterranean Games bronze medalists for Turkey
Competitors at the 2009 Mediterranean Games
Competitors at the 2013 Mediterranean Games
Mediterranean Games medalists in boxing